In science and especially in mathematical studies, a variational principle is one that enables a problem to be solved using calculus of variations, which concerns finding functions that optimize the values of quantities that depend on those functions. For example, the problem of determining the shape of a hanging chain suspended at both ends—a catenary—can be solved using variational calculus, and in this case, the variational principle is the following: The solution is a function that minimizes the gravitational potential energy of the chain.

Overview
Any physical law which can be expressed as a variational principle describes a self-adjoint operator. These expressions are also called Hermitian. Such an expression describes an invariant under a Hermitian transformation.

History

Felix Klein's Erlangen program attempted to identify such invariants under a group of transformations. In what is referred to in physics as Noether's theorem, the Poincaré group of transformations (what is now called a gauge group) for general relativity defines symmetries under a group of transformations which depend on a variational principle, or action principle.

Examples

In mathematics
 The Rayleigh–Ritz method for solving boundary-value problems approximately
 Ekeland's variational principle in mathematical optimization
 The finite element method
 The variation principle relating topological entropy and Kolmogorov-Sinai entropy.

In physics
 Fermat's principle in geometrical optics
 Maupertuis' principle in classical mechanics
 The principle of least action in mechanics, electromagnetic theory, and quantum mechanics
 The variational method in quantum mechanics
 Gauss's principle of least constraint and Hertz's principle of least curvature
 Hilbert's action principle in general relativity, leading to the Einstein field equations.
 Palatini variation
 Gibbons–Hawking–York boundary term

References

External links
The Feynman Lectures on Physics Vol. II Ch. 19: The Principle of Least Action
 
 S T Epstein  1974 "The Variation Method in Quantum Chemistry". (New York: Academic)
 C Lanczos, The Variational Principles of Mechanics (Dover Publications)
 R K Nesbet 2003 "Variational Principles and Methods In Theoretical Physics and Chemistry". (New York: Cambridge U.P.)
 S K Adhikari  1998 "Variational Principles for the Numerical Solution of Scattering Problems". (New York: Wiley)
 C G Gray, G Karl G and V A Novikov 1996, Ann. Phys. 251 1.
 C.G. Gray, G. Karl, and V. A. Novikov, "Progress in Classical and Quantum Variational Principles". 11 December 2003. physics/0312071 Classical Physics.

 John Venables, "The Variational Principle and some applications". Dept of Physics and Astronomy, Arizona State University, Tempe, Arizona (Graduate Course: Quantum Physics)
 Andrew James Williamson, "The Variational Principle -- Quantum monte carlo calculations of electronic excitations". Robinson College, Cambridge,  Theory of Condensed Matter Group, Cavendish Laboratory. September 1996. (dissertation of Doctor of Philosophy)
 Kiyohisa Tokunaga, "Variational Principle for Electromagnetic Field". Total Integral for Electromagnetic Canonical Action, Part Two, Relativistic Canonical Theory of Electromagnetics, Chapter VI
Komkov, Vadim (1986) Variational principles of continuum mechanics with engineering applications. Vol. 1. Critical points theory. Mathematics and its Applications, 24. D. Reidel Publishing Co., Dordrecht.
 Cassel, Kevin W.: Variational Methods with Applications in Science and Engineering, Cambridge University Press, 2013.

 
Theoretical physics
Articles containing proofs
Principles